The japygids (family Japygidae) are a taxon of hexapods, of the order Diplura, commonly known as forcepstails.

In this family, the paired cerci at the end of their abdomens are pincer-like (superficially similar to the unrelated earwigs) and are used to catch their tiny prey. Seventy genera are recognised, divided among seven subfamilies.

Extant genera

Abjapyx Silvestri, 1948
Afrojapyx Silvestri, 1948
Allojapyx Silvestri, 1948
Allurjapyx Silvestri, 1930
Atlasjapyx Chou & Huang, 1986
Austrjapyx Silvestri, 1948
Burmjapyx Silvestri, 1931
Catajapyx Silvestri, 1933
Centrjapyx Silvestri, 1948
Chiljapyx Smith, 1962
Choujapyx Huang, 2001
Congjapyx Pagés, 1954
Ctenjapyx Silvestri, 1948
Deutojapyx Paclt, 1957
Dipljapyx Silvestri, 1948
Ectasjapyx Silvestri, 1929
Eojapyx Smith, 1960
Epijapyx Silvestri, 1933
Evalljapyx Silvestri, 1911
Gallojapyx Pagés, 1993
Gigasjapyx Chou, 1984
Gollumjapyx Sendra & Ortuño, 2006
Hainanjapyx Chou in Chou & Chen, 1983
Hapljapyx Silvestri, 1948
Hecajapyx Smith, 1959
Henicjapyx Silvestri, 1948
Heterojapyx Verhoeff, 1904
Holjapyx Silvestri, 1948
Hutanjapyx Pagés, 1995
Indjapyx Silvestri, 1931
Isojapyx Silvestri, 1948
Japygellus Silvestri, 1930
Japygianus Silvestri, 1947
Japyginus Silvestri, 1930
Japyx Haliday, 1864
Kinabalujapyx Pagés, 1994
Kohjapyx Pagés, 1953
Megajapyx Verhoeff, 1904
Merojapyx Silvestri, 1948
Mesjapyx Silvestri, 1948
Metajapyx Silvestri, 1933
Mixojapyx Silvestri, 1933
Monojapyx Paclt, 1957
Nanojapyx Smith, 1959
Nelsjapyx Smith, 1962
Neojapyx Silvestri, 1933
Notojapyx Paclt, 1957
Occasjapyx Silvestri, 1948
Oncojapyx Silvestri, 1948
Opisthjapyx Silvestri, 1929
Parindjapyx Silvestri, 1933
Pauperojapyx Pagés, 1995
Penjapyx Smith, 1962
Polyjapyx Silvestri, 1948
Proncojapyx Silvestri, 1948
Protjapyx Silvestri, 1948
Provalljapyx Silvestri, 1948
Psalidojapyx Pagés, 2000
Rectojapyx Pagés, 1954
Rossjapyx Smith, 1962
Scottojapyx Pagés, 1957
Shaanxijapyx Chou in Chou & Chen, 1983
Silvestriapyx Pagés, 1981
Sinjapyx Silvestri, 1948
Troglojapyx Pagés, 1980
Typhlolabia Scudder, 1876
Ultrajapyx Paclt, 1957
Unjapyx Silvestri, 1948
Urojapyx Pagés, 1955
Xenjapyx Silvestri, 1948

Extinct genera
†Ferrojapyx Wilson & Martill, 2001
†Onychojapyx Pierce, 1950

References

Diplura
Arthropod families